Liam Christopher O'Brien (born May 28, 1976) is an American voice actor, writer, and director. He is a regular cast member of the Dungeons & Dragons actual play series Critical Role, playing Vax'ildan ("Vax"), Caleb Widogast, and Orym. He has been involved in many video games, cartoons, and English-language adaptations of Japanese anime. His major anime roles include Gaara in Naruto, Vincent Law in Ergo Proxy, Captain Jushiro Ukitake in Bleach, Lloyd in Code Geass, Kenzo Tenma in Monster, Akihiko Sanada in Persona 3, and Nephrite in the Viz Media dub of Sailor Moon.

In cartoons, O'Brien has voiced characters in shows such as Star Wars Rebels, Transformers: Robots in Disguise, Avengers Assemble, Wolverine and the X-Men, and Hulk and the Agents of S.M.A.S.H.. In video games, he voiced Gollum in Middle-earth: Shadow of Mordor and its sequel, Caius Ballad in Final Fantasy XIII-2 and Lightning Returns: Final Fantasy XIII, War in Darksiders, Asura in Asura's Wrath, Ieyasu Tokugawa in Sengoku Basara: Samurai Heroes, Illidan Stormrage in World of Warcraft and Heroes of the Storm, Yasuo in League of Legends, Grimoire Weiss in NieR and Nier Replicant ver.1.22474487139..., the Warden in For Honor, and Barker in Titanfall 2.

He is an automated dialog replacement writer for anime and has provided voice direction for over 300 episodes of anime such as Naruto. He has also voice directed for video games such as The Last of Us, Evolve, Resident Evil 5, and Resident Evil 6.

Early life
Liam Christopher O'Brien was born in Weehawken, New Jersey, on May 28, 1976. His mother, Lois Wiltse O'Brien, worked as an educator as well as a quality assurance trainer and consultant. He has a sister named Cara. His family were Reformed Christians, and he    was "raised by a Christian mother and attended 15 years of Christian schooling", but would later describe himself as agnostic. He began acting in high school at St. Peter's Preparatory School. After moving to New York City to attend the New York University Tisch School of the Arts, he worked in theater on various productions around the country. He met Crispin Freeman while working on a production of Romeo & Juliet in Cincinnati, Ohio, which helped him get voice-over work back in New York.

Career 

O'Brien affirms that he often plays characters that are insane or evil geniuses, although he has also voiced comedic characters such as Fukuyama in Girls Bravo. He describes Cumore from Tales of Vesperia as "slightly unhinged". In Darksiders, he voices the lead character War, one of the Four Horsemen of the Apocalypse. He describes his voicing as deeper than his usual voice, and that he portrayed War as a fairly old soul who isn't surprised at the events around him. In the video game-based film Final Fantasy VII: Advent Children, he voiced Red XIII. In addition to voice acting, he has worked as a voice director and writer on various video games and anime shows.

He is also a cast member of the popular web series Critical Role, in which he and other voice actors play Dungeons & Dragons. Critical Role was both the Webby Winner and the People's Voice Winner in the "Games (Video Series & Channels)" category at the 2019 Webby Awards; the show was also both a Finalist and the Audience Honor Winner at the 2019 Shorty Awards. After becoming hugely successful, the Critical Role cast left the Geek & Sundry network in early 2019 and set up their own production company, Critical Role Productions. Soon after, they aimed to raise $750,000 on Kickstarter to create an animated series of their first campaign, but ended up raising over $11 million. In November 2019, Amazon Prime Video announced that they had acquired the streaming rights to this animated series, now titled The Legend of Vox Machina; O'Brien reprised his role as Vax'ildan. In June 2021, O'Brien was added to the cast of Exandria Unlimited, a spinoff of Critical Role. O'Brien is also one of the narrators for the audiobook edition of the novel Critical Role: Vox Machina – Kith & Kin (2021).

Personal life
O'Brien married voice actress Amy Kincaid in 2002. The couple have two children: a daughter, Zoe and a son, Owen. They live in Los Angeles.

He suffers from hyperacusis, a hearing disorder that makes him unusually sensitive to everyday noises.

Filmography

Anime

Animation

Film

Other dubbing

Video games

Live action

References

Further reading
 
 
 "Kana's Korner" Interview With Liam O'Brien on 91.8 The Fan

External links

 
 
 Liam O'Brien at Crystal Acids Voice Actor Database
 
Between the Sheets: Liam O'Brien – 2018 video interview by Critical Role

1976 births
21st-century American male actors
American agnostics
American former Christians
American male screenwriters
American male television writers
American male video game actors
American male voice actors
American male web series actors
American television writers
American voice directors
Living people
People from Weehawken, New Jersey
Tisch School of the Arts alumni